Canoeing at the 2016 Summer Olympics in Rio de Janeiro was contested in two main disciplines: canoe slalom, from 7 to 11 August, and canoe sprint, from 15 to 20 August. The slalom competition was held at the Olympic Whitewater Stadium; whereas the sprint events were staged at Lagoa Rodrigo de Freitas in Copacabana. The location for canoeing events was a source of concern for athletes since the Brazilian federal government's Oswaldo Cruz Foundation lab has found the genes of drug-resistant super bacteria in Rodrigo de Freitas lagoon.

Around 330 athletes participated in 16 events.

Qualification

A new qualification system had been created for both slalom and sprint canoeing at the 2016 Olympic Games. The quotas were set for each event by the International Canoe Federation in August 2014.

Competition schedule

Participating

Participating nations

Competitors

Medal summary

By event

Slalom

Sprint
Men

  Serghei Tarnovschi of Moldova finished third, but was stripped of his bronze medal due to a failed doping test.

Women

By nation
Key
 Host nation (Brazil)

See also
Paracanoeing at the 2016 Summer Paralympics

References

External links

 
 
 
 Results Book – Canoe Slalom
 Results Book – Canoe Sprint
 International Canoe Federation

 
2016 Summer Olympics events
2016
Olympics
Canoeing and kayaking competitions in Brazil